As Brave As You is a young adult novel by Jason Reynolds, published May 3, 2016 by Atheneum. The book describes two African-American brothers from Brooklyn who are sent to spend the summer with their grandfather in Virginia.

The book won the Kirkus Prize (2016), as well as the NAACP Image Award for Outstanding Literary Work for Youth/Teen (2017), and the Schneider Family Book Award (2017).

Reception 
As Brave As You received starred reviews from Kirkus, Booklist, Shelf Awareness, and School Library Journal, a five-star review from Common Sense Media, and positive reviews from The Horn Book, The Bulletin of the Center for Children's Books, and Publishers Weekly.

In The Washington Post, Mary Quattlebaum said, "Reynolds deftly blends humor and heart through lively dialogue and spot-on sibling dynamics."

Writing for School Library Journal, Luann Toth called As Brave As You "[a] richly realized story about life and loss, courage and grace, and what it takes to be a man. Although a tad lengthy, it is easy reading and will be appreciated by a broad audience."

The New York Public Library, Kirkus Reviews, Shelf Awareness, the Center for the Study of Multicultural Children's Literature, The Washington Post, and School Library Journal named As Brave As You one of the best books of the year.

References 

2016 children's books
Novels set in Virginia
Books by Jason Reynolds